Jean-Florent Ikwange Ibengé (born 4 December 1961) is a Congolese football coach and former player who manages Sudanese club Al-Hilal Club.

Early and personal life
He was born in Léopoldville on 4 December 1961.

Playing career
Ibengé played as a centre-back for Tennis Borussia Berlin, Excelsior Roubaix, US Boulogne and ES Wasquehal.

Coaching career
He spent his early coaching career in France, managing ES Wasquehal and SC Douai.

He was manager of Chinese club Shanghai Shenhua from April to May 2012, and of Congolese team Vita Club from February 2014.

He became manager of the DR Congo national team in August 2014, combining this role with his job at Vita Club.

He led DR Congo to the 2016 African Nations Championship title in February 2016.

In March 2017, he announced that he intended to step down as national team manager in 2018. He resigned in August 2019. After that, he returned to AS Vita Club.

In July 2021 he became manager of Moroccan club RS Berkane. In June 2022 he became manager of Sudanese club Al-Hilal Club.

Honours 
DR Congo

 African Nations Championship: 2016
 African Cup of Nations third place: 2015

AS Vita Club

 Linafoot: 2014–15, 2017–18, 2020–21
 DR Congo Super Cup: 2015

 CAF Champions League runner-up: 2014
 CAF Confederation Cup runner-up: 2018

RS Berkane

 Moroccan Throne Cup: 2020–21
 CAF Confederation Cup: 2021–22

References

1961 births
Living people
Footballers from Kinshasa
Democratic Republic of the Congo footballers
Tennis Borussia Berlin players
Excelsior AC (France) players
US Boulogne players
Wasquehal Football players
Association football central defenders
Democratic Republic of the Congo football managers
Wasquehal Football managers
SC Douai managers
Shanghai Shenhua F.C. managers
AS Vita Club managers
Democratic Republic of the Congo national football team managers
RS Berkane managers
Al-Hilal Club (Omdurman) managers
Chinese Super League managers
2015 Africa Cup of Nations managers
2017 Africa Cup of Nations managers
2019 Africa Cup of Nations managers
Democratic Republic of the Congo expatriate footballers
Democratic Republic of the Congo expatriates in Germany
Expatriate footballers in Germany
Democratic Republic of the Congo expatriates in France
Expatriate footballers in France
Democratic Republic of the Congo expatriate football managers
Expatriate football managers in France
Democratic Republic of the Congo expatriates in China
Expatriate football managers in China
Democratic Republic of the Congo expatriates in Morocco
Expatriate football managers in Morocco
Democratic Republic of the Congo expatriate sportspeople in Sudan
Expatriate football managers in Sudan
21st-century Democratic Republic of the Congo people